Rockanje is a village in the Dutch province of South Holland. It is a part of the municipality of Voorne aan Zee, and lies about 7 km northwest of Hellevoetsluis.

In 2001, the village of Rockanje had 4805 inhabitants. The built-up area of the village was 1.2 km², and contained 2004 residences. 
The statistical area "Rockanje", which also can include the peripheral parts of the village, as well as the surrounding countryside, has a population of around 5710.

Rockanje was a separate municipality until 1980, when it became part of Westvoorne.

References

Populated places in South Holland
Former municipalities of South Holland
Voorne aan Zee